Raymond James "Ray" Smith (born 18 April 1943) is an English former footballer who played as a centre forward. He scored 123 goals from 347 appearances in the Football League playing for Southend Unitedfor whom he top-scored in the 1966–67 seasonWrexham and Peterborough United. He also played for Bangor City.

References

1943 births
Living people
Footballers from Islington (district)
English footballers
Association football forwards
Southend United F.C. players
Wrexham A.F.C. players
Peterborough United F.C. players
Bangor City F.C. players
English Football League players